Viluppuram is a municipality in Tamil Nadu, India

Viluppuram,  or Villupuram, may also refer to:
 Viluppuram district, a district in Tamil Nadu, India
 Viluppuram taluk, a taluk in Viluppuram district
 Viluppuram (Lok Sabha constituency)
 Villupuram (State Assembly Constituency)